McGauley is a surname. Notable people with the surname include:

Pat McGauley (born 1961), American soccer player
Shannon McGauley (born 1963), American activist
Tim McGauley (born 1995), Canadian ice hockey player

See also
McAuley (surname)
McCauley (surname)